Saigon Times Daily is an English-language daily newspaper published in Ho Chi Minh City, Vietnam. This is one of two English-language dailies (the other is Vietnam News). Saigon News is part of several other newspapers owned by Saigon Times Group.

Saigon Times Daily focuses mainly on local economic and social situation with its main readers in Ho Chi Minh City and Đông Nam Bộ. It is also available on flights of Vietnam Airlines.  It is available at various newsstands in Vietnam.

Newspapers published in Vietnam
English-language newspapers published in Asia
Mass media in Ho Chi Minh City